The India women's national under-16 basketball team is a national basketball team of India and is governed by the Basketball Federation of India.
It represents the country in international under-16 (under age 16) women's basketball competitions.

Competitive history

FIBA U-17 Women's World Cup
  2010 to  2022 : Did not qualify

FIBA U-16 Women's Asian Championship
  2009 : 6th
  2011 : 5th
  2013 : 5th
  2015 : 6th
  2017 (Div B) : 1st
  2022 : 5th

See also
India women's national basketball team
India women's national under-18 basketball team
India men's national under-16 basketball team

References

External links
Archived records of India team participations

Under
Women's national under-16 basketball teams
Basketball